The women's 3000 m speed skating competition for the 2002 Winter Olympics was held in Salt Lake City, Utah, United States.

Claudia Pechstein won the gold medal at the distance after winning two bronzes and a silver medal in previous Olympics. Favorite Anni Friesinger finished fourth, while all medalists broke the former world record.

Records

Prior to this competition, the existing world and Olympic records were as follows.

The following new world and Olympic records were set during this competition.

Results

References

Women's speed skating at the 2002 Winter Olympics
Women's events at the 2002 Winter Olympics